Rača is a borough of Bratislava, Slovakia, in the Bratislava III district.

Names and etymology
The name probably comes from the Slavic personal name Radša/Radoslav or the Slavic stem vorč-/vrača (a fence).  The name was adopted by Germans as Rechesdorf (literally Rača's village, 1390). The Germanized form had been used even by the Slovaks themselves, e.g., Račissdorf (1914),  Račištorf (1920-1946) except for a short period in 1920 when the official name was Raslavice. In 1946, its original name Rača was restored.

History
Rača was mentioned for the first time in 1296 as a vineyard village under the name villa Racha. In 1946, the village became a borough of Bratislava.

Notes

References

External links
Borough website

Boroughs of Bratislava
Villages in Slovakia merged with towns